Burscough Priory, at Burscough, Lancashire, England, was an Augustinian foundation, established in around 1190 and dissolved in around 1536. Some remains of the church survive.

History
The priory was founded in c. 1190 by Robert Fitz-Henry, Lord of Lathom, for Augustinian canons. In 1390 the Lordship of the Manor and lands of Lathom passed to the Stanley family, several of whom were buried in the Priory, notably Sir Thomas Stanley, 1st Baron Stanley, K.G., of Lathom and Knowsley, in February 1459, his wife Joan in 1466, and their son Thomas Stanley, 1st Earl of Derby.

The priory was dedicated to St. Nicholas. There was an associated leper hospital.  Fitz-Henry endowed it with land in Burscough, the entire adjoining township of Marton, the chapel of St. Leonard of Knowsley,  all the mills on his demesne, and the patronage of three parish churches—at Ormskirk, Huyton, and Flixton. The ownership of Flixton however proved problematic. From the 1330s until the dissolution, the vicar of Ormskirk was always one of the canons of the priory. A Royal Charter that was granted by Edward I of England in 1286 to the monks at Burscough Priory permitted a regular market nearby in Ormskirk.

Dissolution
As a priory  with an income of less than £200, it was dissolved under the act of February 1536. At the time of its surrender the religious community consisted of only five canons, including the prior. The Earl of Derby made attempts to save the church, in which many of his family had been buried, but they came to nothing and upon dissolution, many bodies were moved to Ormskirk which ever since has been the burial place of the Stanleys.

Following the dissolution eight bells from the Priory were moved to Ormskirk Parish Church, where a tower had to be built specially, as the existing steeple could not support them. The remaining bells were removed to Croston church. The tenor bell at the Ormskirk Church (the third bell from the Priory) has a Latin inscription which translates as "J.S. de Burscough, Esq., and E. my wife, made [this bell] in honour of the Trinity. R.B. 1497". It also bears the symbols of the rose, portcullis and Fleur-de-lis which suggests that the bell was presented in honour of a visit from Henry VII as these were some of his favourite badges.

The Priory gives its name to the local high school Burscough Priory Academy, which has an enrollment of around 700 pupils of ages 11–16 years.

Other burials
Sir John Stanley (died 1414)
John I Stanley of the Isle of Man
Joan Goushill Stanley, daughter of Elizabeth Fitzalan, Duchess of Norfolk
Thomas Stanley, 1st Baron Stanley
Thomas Stanley, 1st Earl of Derby

Architecture
On the south side of the nave was a cloister  square. The seal used on the surrender deed of the priory shows a view of the monastic buildings.

They survive to some height above the springing of the crossing arches, although the voussoirs of the arches themselves have been removed.
There are  fragmentary walls projecting  from the eastern pier  to the north and east, while the  other incorporates a small trefoil-headed recess or aumbry. These remains probably date from the late 13th century.

See also

Grade I listed buildings in Lancashire
Scheduled monuments in Lancashire
Listed buildings in Ormskirk

References

Augustinian monasteries in England
Buildings and structures in the Borough of West Lancashire
Grade I listed churches in Lancashire
Grade I listed buildings in Lancashire
Grade I listed monasteries
Monasteries in Lancashire
Ruins in Lancashire
1186 establishments in England
1530s disestablishments in England
Religious organizations established in the 1180s
Scheduled monuments in Lancashire
Christian monasteries established in the 12th century